This List of British racecourses gives details of both current and former horse racing venues in Great Britain. In addition, there is a former racecourse, Folkestone closed in 2012 and although the stands and stables remain the site is included in a plan to build houses. The track itself is overgrown with all rails and fences removed shortly after closure. Hereford racecourse reopened in October 2016 having been closed since 2012. Towcester racecourse is not operating as a horse racing venue as of 2023 and the future of racing there is uncertain.

Current
The following British horse racing courses are in operation as of :

Closed
There are two further racecourses in Britain that still exist, but are closed as of November 2022 and do not operate any thoroughbred racing fixtures.
Folkestone Racecourse, Kent; closed in December 2012.
Towcester Racecourse, Northamptonshire; closed in October 2019.

Former
Through the centuries, racing has taken place at various courses throughout Britain which have since closed down.  Some were very significant in their day and held major races which persist to this day.  For example, the flat season's traditional curtain raiser, the Lincolnshire Handicap was once held at the racecourse that gave it its name in Lincoln but is now held at Doncaster.

20th century
Between 1900 and 1981, 97 racecourses closed their doors. Closed date refers to the last date on which racing took place at the venue.

19th century
Many courses that were prominent in earlier times did not survive into the modern era. The list below is a selection of these, taken from Whyte's History of the British Turf. Where dates are not given for closure, it is possible they were still extant in the 20th century.  No distinction has been made between enclosed courses of the type that are familiar now and those that were run over unenclosed courses, more akin to point-to-point racing. Indeed, some of these racecourses or parts of them are still used for that purpose.

Numbers in the 18th-19th centuries

18th century
Whyte's History of the British Turf (1840) lists 48 places where racing was discontinued in the latter half of the 18th century:

NB Racing is recorded at various of these places after 1840.
There is also reference to a Royal Plate race being held at Guilford (sic) from 1727 at the latest and Burford from 1755.

Other sites
Race results from places not listed by Whyte can also be found in the historical record. These include:
Blankney Races
New Malton
Radcliffe Bridge
Tarporley Hunt
Tewkesbury

References

Bibliography